Moncrieff is a suburb in the Gungahlin district of Canberra, the National Capital of Australia. The name was gazetted in April 1991, with initial land releases becoming available to developers in June 2014. It is named after Gladys Moncrieff, an Australian singer of the 1920-1930s musical era who was dubbed 'Australia's Queen of Song'. The suburb is in north Gungahlin, adjacent to the existing suburbs of Ngunnawal and Amaroo and the future suburbs of Taylor and Jacka. It is home to the Moncrieff Community Recreation Park, which was voted the ACT's favourite playground in 2021.

Like most new Canberra suburbs, it is a cat containment area: all cats have to be kept inside the cat owner's property and within an enclosure if outside.

Geography

Three hills dominate the area, the highest which is 674 metres above sea level. The green belt is characterised by grassland, yellow box–red gum woodland and lowland woodland.

Geology

The rock under Moncrieff consists of Canberra Formation of middle Silurian age. It consists of shale, slate, and mudstone.

References

Suburbs of Canberra